Donatas Škarnulis (born 21 October 1977) is a Lithuanian race walker.

He finished twelfth at the 2007 World Championships in Osaka. He also competed at the 2006 World Race Walking Cup.

Achievements

References

1977 births
Living people
Lithuanian male racewalkers
Athletes (track and field) at the 2008 Summer Olympics
Olympic athletes of Lithuania